Turkey competes at the 2009 World Championships in Athletics from 15 to 23 August in Berlin. A team of 12 athletes was announced in preparation for the competition.

Medalists

Team selection

Results

Men

Field events

Women
Track and road events

Field and combined events

References

External links
Official competition website

Nations at the 2009 World Championships in Athletics
World Championships in Athletics
2009